Matt Doyle or Matthew Doyle may refer to:

Matt Doyle (actor) (born 1987), American stage and film actor 
Matt Doyle (tennis) (born 1958), former American and later Irish tour tennis player